Goody, Goodies, or Goody's may refer to:

Brands
 Goody (brand), a brand of hair styling products owned by ACON Investments, LLC.
 Goody's Powder, a pain reliever sold primarily in the southern United States
 Goody's (restaurant), a fast food chain in Greece and neighboring countries
 Goody's (store), a retail clothing chain in the United States

Film and TV
 The Goodies, a UK comedy trio, Grahame Garden, Tim Brooke-Taylor and Bill Oddie
 The Goodies (TV series), a British television comedy series created by The Goodies
 The Goodies (film), 1959 German film

Music

Albums
 Goodies (J. J. Johnson album) recorded in 1965
 Goodies (George Benson album), recorded in 1968
  Goodies (Ciara album), a 2004 album by Ciara
 Goodies: The Videos & More, a 2005 DVD by Ciara

Songs
 "Goodies", song by girl band The Goodees 1969
 "Goodies" (song), a 2004 song by Ciara
 "Goody Goody", a 1936 song composed by Matty Malneck, with lyrics by Johnny Mercer
 "Goody Two Shoes" (song), 1982 song by Adam Ant

Other uses
 Goodwife or Goody, a former courtesy title of married women
 Confectionery or candy
 Goody or goodie, a hero or protagonist in a story or film
 Goody, Kentucky, an unincorporated community
 Goody (dessert), an Irish pudding-like dish
 Goody (name)
 Sam Goody, music and entertainment retailer in the United States
 Goody (video game), a 1987 video game

See also 
 The History of Little Goody Two-Shoes, children's story (1765)
 Goodey, a surname
 Goudie, a surname
 Goudie (band), a glam rock band from Austin, Texas
 The Goodees, an American pop music girl group active in the late 1960s